Aguna is a genus of Neotropical skipper butterflies in the family Hesperiidae (Eudaminae).

Species
The following species are recognised in the genus Aguna: 
 Aguna albistria (Plötz, 1880) 
 A. albistria albistria (Mabille, 1888) – Brazil
 A. albistria leucogramma (Mabille, 1888) – southeast Mexico to Colombia and Venezuela (Suriname?) 
 Aguna asander (Hewitson, 1867) – gold-spotted aguna – type locality Brazil 
 A. asander asander (Hewitson, 1867) – southern U.S. (as stray) to Argentina 
 A. asander haitensis (Mabille & Boullet, 1912) – Cuba and Hispaniola 
 A. asander jasper Evans, 1952 – Jamaica 
 Aguna aurunce Hewitson, 1867 – type locality Brazil 
 A. aurunce aurunce (Plötz, 1880)
 A. aurunce hypozonius (Plötz, 1880) – south east Mexico to Venezuela 
 Aguna camagura (R. Williams, 1926) – type locality Brazil 
 Aguna cirrus Evans, 1952 – type locality Brazil 
 Aguna claxon Evans, 1952 – emerald aguna – Cuba, southern Texas to Colombia and Suriname
 Aguna clina Evans, 1952 – type locality Colombia 
 Aguna coeloides Austin & O. Mielke, 1998 – southeastern Mexico to southern Brazil 
 Aguna coelus (Stoll, 1781) – Stoll's aguna – Costa Rica and Panama to Peru and central Brazil 
 Aguna ganna (Möschler, 1879) – Ganna aguna – Costa Rica to Colombia and Venezuela 
 Aguna glaphyrus (Mabille, 1888) – type locality Brazil 
 Aguna latifascia Austin & O. Mielke, 1998 – type locality Ecuador 
 Aguna latimacula Austin & O. Mielke, 1998 – type locality Brazil 
 Aguna longicauda Austin & O. Mielke, 1998 – type locality Brazil
 Aguna megaeles (Mabille, 1888) 
 A. megaeles malia Evans, 1952 – type locality Venezuela 
 A. megaeles megaeles (Mabille, 1888) – type locality Brazil 
 Aguna mesodentata Austin & O. Mielke, 1998 – type locality Brazil 
 Aguna metophis (Latreille, [1824]) – long-tailed aguna – south Texas to south Brazil 
 Aguna nicolayi Austin & O. Mielke, 1998 – type locality Brazil 
 Aguna panama Austin & O. Mielke, 1998 – Panamanian aguna – Honduras to Venezuela 
 Aguna parva Austin & O. Mielke, 1998 – type locality Brazil 
 Aguna penicillata Austin & O. Mielke, 1998 – type locality Brazil 
 Aguna prasinus Siewert, Leviski, O. Mielke & Casagrande, 2015
 Aguna similis Austin & O. Mielke, 1998 – type locality Brazil 
 Aguna spatulata Austin & O. Mielke, 1998 – type locality Brazil 
 Aguna spicata Austin & O. Mielke, 1998 – type locality Brazil 
 Aguna squamalba Austin & O. Mielke, 1998 – type locality Brazil 
 Aguna venezuelae O. Mielke, 1971 – type locality Venezuela

References

Austin, George T., Olaf H. H. Mielke. 2008. Hesperiidae of Rondônia, Brazil: Porphyrogenes Watson (Lepidoptera: Pyrginae: Eudamini), with descriptions of new species from Central and South America Insecta Mundi 0044:1-56

External links

images representing Aguna at Consortium for the Barcode of Life

Eudaminae
Hesperiidae of South America
Hesperiidae genera
Taxa named by Francis Xavier Williams